Lilja Rafney Magnúsdóttir (born 24 June 1957) is an Icelandic politician.

See also
Politics of Iceland

References

External links 
 Lilja Rafney Magnúsdóttir, at the parliament website

Lilja Rafney Magnusdottir
Lilja Rafney Magnusdottir
Living people
1957 births
Place of birth missing (living people)